A flight computer is a form of circular slide rule used in aviation and one of a very few analog computers in widespread use in the 21st century. Sometimes it is called by the make or model name like E6B, CR, CRP-5 or in German, as the Dreieckrechner.

They are mostly used in flight training, but many professional pilots still carry and use flight computers. They are used during flight planning (on the ground before takeoff) to aid in calculating fuel burn, wind correction, time en route, and other items. In the air, the flight computer can be used to calculate ground speed, estimated fuel burn and updated estimated time of arrival. The back is designed for wind correction calculations, i.e., determining how much the wind is affecting one's speed and course.

(Electronic option is available and can be used on FAA exams but pilots are still expected to know how to use the analog version.)

One of the most useful parts of the E6B, is the technique of finding distance over time. Take the number 60 on the inner circle which usually has an arrow, and sometimes says rate on it. 60 is used in reference to the number of minutes in an hour, by placing the 60 on the airspeed in knots, on the outer ring the pilot can find how far the aircraft will travel in any given number of minutes. Looking at the inner ring for minutes traveled and the distance traveled will be above it on the outer ring. This can also be done backwards to find the amount of time the aircraft will take to travel a given number of nautical miles. On the main body of the flight computer it will find the wind component grid, which it will use to find how much crosswind the aircraft will actually has to correct for.

The crosswind component is the amount of crosswind in knots that is being applied to the airframe and can be less than the actual speed of the wind because of the angle. Below that the pilot will find a grid called crosswind correction, this grid shows the difference the pilot needs to correct for because of wind. On either side of the front it will have rulers, one for statute miles and one for nautical miles on their sectional map.

Another very useful part is the conversion scale on the front outer circle, which helps convert between Fahrenheit and Celsius. The back of the E6B is used to find ground speed and determine how much wind correction it needs.

Gallery

See also 
Wind triangle 
Dead reckoning
Flight Management Computer

References

 
Analog computers